Raceway Park (1938–2000) was a quarter mile stock car race track located in Blue Island, Illinois, on 130th Street and Ashland Avenue between Western Avenue and Halsted Avenue, used for stock car races from the mid-1930s until 2000. In all advertising, it was billed as being located in Blue Island, Illinois, but was really located right across the border in the town of Calumet Park.

History 
Raceway Park had originally been created as a dog racing track, but in the early 1930s the state of Illinois made dog racing illegal. Harry Malone then led a group promoting the track as a midget car track. Raceway finally opened for competitive racing on September 24, 1938. The winner of the first race was Harry McQuinn, who eventually went on to compete in the Indianapolis 500. The track had changed management many times during the early 1940s. Art Folz and Wally Zale assumed the management position in 1940, but their management reign was cut short when Zale was killed in a car-train wreck in 1942. Then, World War II stopped all racing in America for the time being. Rudy Nichels started promoting the track after the war, but with only limited success.  Track was demolished in the early 2000s and is now the site of the Raceway Park Center a shopping center that houses an Ultra Foods, AJ Wright and Aldi Food Store among other businesses

The Jenin Brothers 
Pete and Nick Jenin purchased the land in 1947, and immediately made drastic changes. The Jenin's slightly banked the oval, erected grandstands and concessions, and purchased more land for more parking. In 1951 the track was changed from clay to asphalt. In the same year an 80-race season took place. During its prime, races were held Wednesday, Friday, Saturday, and Sunday. The track soon took on the nickname "World's Busiest Track". The track became so popular that the Jenin brothers entertained the thought of racing 7 days a week, so they could handle the massive crowds.

The end of the Jenin Brothers partnership 
In 1952 Nick Jenin sold his share of the track to Jimmy Derrico. Derrico accompanied Pete Jenin in the ownership of the oval until 1968. The track was then leased to N. Perry Luster of National Racing Affiliates Insurance fame. In 1970 Peter Jenin became the sole promoter of the track. During Jenins second term as track promoter the track was repaved, the pits were expanded, a digital scoreboard was erected, and a bandstand was also erected. In 1980 Jenin wanted to spend more time on his other business, so he joined a 5- man promotional team. But the pact was voided in 1982 and Jenin once again became the sole owner of the track.

The Koehler and Pronger Era 
Bud Koehler racked up 490 career wins at Raceway Park and 11 late model track championship awards before retiring in 1979. Bob 
Pronger raced in the Daytona 500 and won the Raceway Park late-model championship in 1961 and 1969 and compiled 148 career wins at Raceway. - Short track Racing Magazine January 1994- Article by Rick Dal Corobbo. In Memory of Rick Dal Corobbo.

Track Champions

Midgets 
1939 Ted Duncan
1940 Ted Duncan
1941 Tony Bettenhausen
1942 Tony Bettenhausen
1945 Tony Bettenhausen
1946 Mike O'Halloran
1947 Tony Bettenhausen
1948 Ray Richards
1949 Bud Koehler
1950 Eddie Russo
1951 Bud Koehler
1952 Bud Koehler
1959 Bob Tattersall
1960 Russ Sweedler
1961 Mel Kenyon
1971 Tom Steiner
1977 Bob Richards
1982 Mack McClellan
1987 John Warren
1988 John Warren
1989 Steve Thinnes

Convertibles 
1955 Bob Button

Novices 
1957 Augie Wolf
1958 Bill Heyser
1959 Ed Kilpatrick
1960 Rich Miller
1966 Wayne Adams Jr.
1967 Jerry Welch

Rookies 
1961 Wayne Bowdish
1962 Don Saynay

Claiming 
1963 Ray Freeman
1964 Ron Wilkerson

Amateurs 
1964 Ray Para
1965 Ray Para
1970 Chuck Manis

6-Cylinders 
1968 Johnny Buben
1969 Vern Mullennix
1971 Mel McKeever
1972 George Abbott
1973 Guy Carnagey
1974 Tom Nielsen
1975 Al Stutchel
1976 Bruce O'Dell

Modifieds 
1970 Whitey Harris
1971 Johnny Reimer

Mini-Stocks 
1970 Dave Decker
1971 Dave Decker
1975 Klaus Wever
1976 Bob Reiter
1984 Alberto Cabrera
1985 Alberto Cabrera
1986 Alberto Cabrera
1987 Ben Slachta
1988 Russ Foust
1989 Dave Botkin

Sportsmen 
1971 Jeff Koehler
1979 Leo Mens
1980 Terry Laxton
1981 Jake Oudshoorn

Spectator 
1982 Jim Gilbert
1983 Ron Deutsch
1984 Ron Deutsch
1985 John Rastovsky
1986 Bob Wall
1987 Bob Wall
1988 Randy Gifford
1989 Chuck Janko
1990 John Brolick
1991 Scott Cicuto

Semi-Pros 
1993 Mike Carpenter
1994 Joe Jones
1995 Joe O'Connor
1996 Mark Olejniczak
1997 Bob Cagle
1998 Louie Pasderetz
1999 John Senerchia
2000 Bill Neering

Dwarf Cars 
1998 Jeff Scherer
1999 Roger Osborne
2000 Al Claps

Late Model 
1949 Bud Koehler
1950 Hal Ruyle
1951 Bill Van Allen
1952 Bud Koehler
1953 Bryant Tucker
1954 Bud Koehler
1955 Tom Cox
1956 Bob Button
1957 Bud Koehler
1958 Bill Van Allen
1959 Bob Williams
1960 Harry Simonsen
1961 Bob Pronger
1962 Ray Young
1963 Bill Cornwall
1964 Bud Koehler
1965 Ted Janecyk
1966 Bud Koehler
1967 Bud Koehler
1968 Jerry Kemperman
1969 Bob Pronger
1970 George Hill
1971 Ray Freeman
1972 Bud Koehler
1973 Ray Young
1974 Bud Koehler
1975 Bud Koehler
1976 Bud Koehler
1977 Larry Middleton
1978 Larry Middleton
1979 Dave Weltmeyer
1980 Dave Weltmeyer
1981 Bob Weltmeyer
1982 Bob Weltmeyer
1983 Dave Weltmeyer
1984 Pat Echlin
1985 Wayne Para
1986 Mike Pockrus
1987 Jim Johnson
1988 Mike White
1989 Joe Witkowski
1990 Joe Witkowski
1991 Pat Echlin
1992 Pat Echlin
1993 Pat Echlin
1994 John Brolick
1995 Kevin Reidy
1996 Gary Raven
1997 John Brolick
1998 Gary Raven
1999 Kevin Reidy
2000 Kevin Reidy

Hobby Stocks 
1973 Jack Thomas
1974 Dave Urewicz
1975 Burt Weitemeyer
1976 Jerry Clark
1977 Al Ponton
1978 Barbara Bosak
1979 Don Helwig
1980 Mike Varner
1981 Scott Sterkowitz
1982 Craig Johnson
1985 Dennis Ponton
1986 Bob Copley
1987 John Hargus
1988 Hank Pugh
1989 Tony Meier
1990 Mike Tobuch
1991 Mike Tobuch

Hobby Stock Cadets 
1978 Jack Annen

Hobby Stock Class A 
1983 Paul Yancick
1984 Dave Duckworth

Hobby Stock Class B 
1983 Dan Weltmeyer
1984 Dan Deutsch

Street Stocks 
1992 Don Kritenbrink
1993 Rob Delinsky
1994 Ron Haney
1995 Mike Szekley
1996 Guy Baumann
1997 Russ Vankuiken
1998 D.J. Helwig
1999 Ryan Dix
2000 Scott Gardner

Enduros 
1991 Lennord Napoleon Car No.12 Peotone, IL
1992 Peter Hernandez
1993 Alan Powell
1994 Pat O'Rourke
1995 Keith Volkman
1996 Don Ackerman, Car No. 27, Homewood, IL
1997 Mike Buder
1998 Kent DeGraff
1999 Frank Flory, Car No. 8, Homewood, IL
2000 Eddie Wolf

External links 
www.RacewayParkHistory.com
www.ShortTrackNews.com

Sports venues in Cook County, Illinois
Motorsport venues in Illinois
Defunct motorsport venues in the United States